

Incumbents
President: Daniel Salamanca Urey until November 27, José Luis Tejada Sorzano from December 1
Vice President: José Luis Tejada Sorzano until November 27

Events
May 10–25 - Battle of Cañada Strongest
November 27 - President Salamanca deposed by generals in coup d'état

Births
January 20 - Óscar Zamora Medinaceli, Bolivian politician, lawyer (d. 2017)

Deaths

See also
Chaco War

 
1930s in Bolivia
Years of the 20th century in Bolivia